Associação Portuguesa Londrinense, usually known simply as Portuguesa Londrinense, is a Brazilian football team from the city of Londrina, Paraná state, founded on May 14, 1950.

History
On May 14, 1950, the club was founded as Associação Atlética Portuguesa de Desportos.

In 1997, the club was renamed to its current name, Associação Portuguesa Londrinense, after returning to compete in professional competitions. The club merged with Cambé Atlético Clube in 2007.

References

 
Association football clubs established in 1950
Sport in Londrina
1950 establishments in Brazil